The Red Shoes is the seventh studio album by English musician Kate Bush. Released on 2 November 1993, it was accompanied by Bush's short film, The Line, the Cross and the Curve, and was her last album before a 12-year hiatus. The album peaked at number two on the UK Albums Chart and has been certified platinum by the British Phonographic Industry (BPI), denoting shipments in excess of 300,000 copies. In the United States, the album reached number 28 on the Billboard 200, her highest-peaking album on the chart at the time.

Overview
The Red Shoes was inspired by the 1948 film of the same name by Michael Powell and Emeric Pressburger, which itself was inspired by the fairy tale of the same name by Hans Christian Andersen. It concerns a dancer, possessed by her art, who cannot take off the eponymous shoes and find peace.

Bush had suggested she would tour in support of The Red Shoes and deliberately aimed for a "live band" feel, with less of the studio trickery that had typified her last three albums (which would be difficult to recreate on stage). However, the tour never materialised.

This was a troubled time for Bush, who had suffered a series of bereavements including the loss of her favoured guitarist, Alan Murphy, as well as her mother, Hannah, who died the year before the album's release. Bush's long-term relationship with bassist Del Palmer had also ended, although the pair continued to work together. "I've been very affected by these last two years", she remarked in late 1991. "They've been incredibly intense years for me. Maybe not on a work level, but a lot has happened to me. I feel I've learnt a lot – and, yes, I think [my next album] is going to be quite different... I hope the people that are waiting for it feel it's worth the wait."

Many of the people she lost are honoured on the ballad "Moments of Pleasure", as well as director Michael Powell, with whom she had discussed working shortly before his death in 1990. Composer and conductor Michael Kamen contributed a score for the song.

Most notably, The Red Shoes featured many more high-profile cameo appearances than her previous efforts. The track "Why Should I Love You?" featured instrumental and vocal contributions from Prince as well as guest vocals from comedian Lenny Henry. "And So Is Love" features guitar work by Eric Clapton, and Gary Brooker (from the band Procol Harum), and Jeff Beck also collaborated. Trio Bulgarka (who had contributed to The Sensual World) appeared on three songs: "You're the One", "The Song of Solomon", and "Why Should I Love You?".

A short film, The Line, the Cross and the Curve, written and directed by Bush, and starring herself and English actress Miranda Richardson, was released the same year. It featured six songs from the album: "Rubberband Girl", "And So Is Love", "The Red Shoes", "Moments of Pleasure", "Eat the Music" and "Lily". The first five were used as promo videos for the singles, though Bush recorded a separate video for the American release of "Rubberband Girl" (though this video is intercut with clips from The Line, the Cross and the Curve). The film was nominated for the Long Form Music Video at the 1996 Grammy Awards.

In 1995, Bush received a Brit Award nomination for Best British Female Artist.

The album was recorded digitally, and Bush has since expressed regrets about the results of this, which is why she revisited seven of the songs using analogue tape for her 2011 album Director's Cut, as well as releasing a remastered version of The Red Shoes in 2011, based on the master from an analogue backup tape.

Bush performed "Lily" and "Top of the City" live for the first time in 2014 as part of the Before the Dawn concert residency.

Track listing

Personnel
 Kate Bush – vocals, keyboards (exc. 4), piano (4, 5, 8, 9), Fender Rhodes (5, 8, 12), bass guitar and guitar (10), co-arranger (11)
 Michael Kamen – orchestral arrangements
 Del Palmer – Fairlight programming, electronic drums
 Stuart Elliott – drums (1–3, 6–9, 11, 12), percussion (1, 3, 5, 7)
 John Giblin – bass guitar (1–3, 6, 8, 9, 12)
 Danny McIntosh – guitar (1, 5–9)
Horn section (1, 3, 9, 11)
 Nigel Hitchcock – tenor saxophone, baritone saxophone (1)
 Steve Sidwell – trumpet, flugelhorn (11)
 Paul Spong – trumpet
 Neil Sidwell – trombone
 Gary Brooker – Hammond organ (2, 9, 12)
 Eric Clapton – guitar (2)
 Paddy Bush – vocals (3, 7, 9), valiha, singing bowls and fujara (6), musical bow, whistle and mandola (7)
 Justin Vali – valiha (3, 7), kabosy and vocals (3)
 Trio Bulgarka – vocals (5, 11, 12)
 Dimitar Penev – vocal arrangements for Trio Bulgarka
 Charlie Morgan – percussion (5)
 Lily Cornford – narrator (6)
 Colin Lloyd Tucker – vocals (7, 9)
 Gaumont d'Olivera – bass guitar (7), drums, percussion and sound effects (10)
 Nigel Kennedy – violin (8, 10), viola (8)
 Prince – keyboards, guitar, bass guitar, vocals and co-arranger (11)
 Lenny Henry – vocals (11)
 Jeff Beck – guitar (12)

 Production
 Kate Bush - producer
 Del Palmer – engineer, mixing
 Haydn Bendall – engineer
 Ian Cooper – mastering

Charts

Weekly charts

Year-end charts

Certifications and sales

References

1993 albums
EMI Records albums
Kate Bush albums
Music based on works by Hans Christian Andersen
Works based on The Red Shoes (fairy tale)